John James "Joe" Greene,  (June 24, 1920 – October 23, 1978) was a Canadian politician.

Life and career
Greene was born in Toronto, Ontario, the son of Andrée (née Charpagnol) and Peter Greene. He grew up in Toronto before finding work in northern Ontario as a mine worker. 

After graduating from the University of Toronto Schools, he served in the Royal Canadian Air Force during World War II and earned the Distinguished Flying Cross. Following the war, he earned a Bachelor of Arts from the University of Toronto and a law degree from Osgoode Hall. He began practice in Toronto, establishing a law firm in Arnprior, Ontario in 1949. In 1948, he married Corinne Bedore.

He ran for the leadership of the Ontario Liberal Party in 1958, placing a poor third at the party's leadership convention.

He was first elected to the House of Commons of Canada as a Liberal in the 1963 general election. In 1964, he ran again for the leadership of the Ontario Liberals, placing fourth.

In 1965, he became Minister of Agriculture in the cabinet of Lester Pearson, one of the few non-farmers to hold the position and the first easterner in 54 years. In 1968, he ran to succeed Pearson in that year's federal Liberal leadership convention, but despite giving what many say was the best speech, he came in fifth place. After three ballots, he threw his support to Pierre Trudeau, contributing towards his victory. The new Prime Minister made Greene Minister of Energy, Mines and Resources.

Greene moved to the riding of Niagara Falls, Ontario in the 1968 election, and was again elected to Parliament. As energy minister, Greene prevented the sale of both the largest oil company under Canadian control and Canada's largest uranium producer to Americans.

Greene suffered a heart attack in 1969, and was required to take a temporary leave of absence from parliament. Otto Lang served as the acting minister of Energy, Mines and Resources in this period.  Green later suffered a stroke in late 1971. Greene retired from cabinet in January 1972 when he was appointed to the Senate of Canada.

He died in 1978, aged 58.

References

1920 births
1978 deaths
Canadian Anglicans
Canadian military personnel of World War II
Lawyers in Ontario
Canadian senators from Ontario
Liberal Party of Canada MPs
Liberal Party of Canada senators
Members of the House of Commons of Canada from Ontario
Members of the King's Privy Council for Canada
Politicians from Toronto
University of Toronto alumni
Liberal Party of Canada leadership candidates
20th-century Canadian lawyers